Mother Earth Brewing Company is a family-owned craft beer brewery located in Vista, California and Nampa, Idaho. The brewery was founded in San Diego County by Daniel Love and Kamron Khannakhjavani in 2010.

History
Mother Earth Brew Co. was founded in 2010. On June 23, 2012, it added the Vista Tap House after the Original Vista Brewery, adding  with a brew shop, which has since been removed. In late 2014, Mother Earth started canning their beers. In 2016, Mother Earth opened an additional production facility and tasting room in Nampa, Idaho, just outside Boise. Founder and CEO Daniel Love moved to look over the facility that was projected in 2016 to produce 22,000 barrels in its first year, which would make them Idaho's largest brewery. 11 months after opening in Nampa, the brewery was capable of producing 100,000 barrels of beer.

Ingredients 
The malted barley comes from Great Western Malting in Pocatello, Idaho and their hops come from Washington.

Collaborations

Awards

See also
Beer in San Diego County, California
List of breweries in San Diego County, California
List of breweries in Idaho

References

External links 
 
Year- Round Beers
Project X Series
4Seasons Series
Mother Earth Vista
Mother Earth Nampa

2010 establishments in California
Beer brewing companies based in San Diego County, California